Tethystola is a genus of beetles in the family Cerambycidae, containing the following species:

 Tethystola brasiliensis Breuning, 1940
 Tethystola cincta Martins & Galileo, 2008
 Tethystola dispar Lameere, 1893
 Tethystola inermis Galileo & Martins, 2001
 Tethystola minima Galileo & Martins, 2001
 Tethystola mutica Gahan, 1895
 Tethystola obliqua Thomson, 1868
 Tethystola unifasciata Galileo & Martins, 2001

References

Apomecynini
Cerambycidae genera